Deleno Matthews, known professionally as Sean C (originally Sean Cane), is an American producer, DJ and "artists and repertoire" (A&R) specialist. Sean is a member of production duo Sean C & LV (Grind Music) which is affiliated with Sean Combs' Hitmen producers. As a DJ, Sean C co-founded the New York DJ crew The X-Men (renamed The X-Ecutioners) Sean worked as an A&R for Steve Rifkind's Loud Records and SRC Records imprints. He is credited as A&R and executive producer for Mobb Deep, Dead Prez, Big Pun, Terror Squad, Remy Ma and The X-Ecutioners. Sean C has produced songs for Jay-Z, Big Pun, Diddy, Jadakiss and Fabolous among others. He was nominated for best rap album Grammy awards for Jay Z's American Gangster and for Big Pun's debut Capital Punishment.

Discography

A&R/Executive Producer Credits

Notes 
A. Produced by LV

References

American hip hop record producers
Living people
American hip hop DJs
African-American record producers
Year of birth missing (living people)
21st-century African-American people